In mathematics, a layer group is a three-dimensional extension of a wallpaper group, with reflections in the third dimension. It is a space group with a two-dimensional lattice, meaning that it is symmetric over repeats in the two lattice directions. The symmetry group at each lattice point is an axial crystallographic point group with the main axis being perpendicular to the lattice plane.

Table of the 80 layer groups, organized by crystal system or lattice type, and by their point groups:

See also 

 Point group
 Crystallographic point group
 Space group
 Rod group
 Frieze group
 Wallpaper group

References

External links 
 Bilbao Crystallographic Server, under "Subperiodic Groups: Layer, Rod and Frieze Groups"
 Nomenclature, Symbols and Classification of the Subperiodic Groups, V. Kopsky and D. B. Litvin
 CVM 1.1: Vibrating Wallpaper by Frank Farris. He constructs layer groups from wallpaper groups using negating isometries.

Euclidean symmetries
Discrete groups